Totten Key is an island of the upper Florida Keys in Biscayne National Park.  It is in Miami-Dade County, Florida.

It is located in southern Biscayne Bay, just west of Old Rhodes Key.

History
It was probably named for General Joseph Totten who was Chief of Engineers for the U.S. Army. In 1848, Totten was in charge of a survey of the Florida coast concentrating on Biscayne Bay, with Robert E. Lee as a subordinate.

U.S. Coast Survey chart #68, Florida Reefs, Key Biscayne to Carysfort Reef (1858) has Totten's Key.

References

Islands of the Florida Keys
Uninhabited islands of Miami-Dade County, Florida
Biscayne National Park
Islands of Florida